Carlyle Lake Resort, also known as White Bear Lake Resort, is a hamlet in White Bear Band Indian reserve, Saskatchewan, Canada. The community is situated on the southern shore of White Bear (Carlyle) Lake on a forested plateau called Moose Mountain Upland. On 31 December 1972, Carlyle Lake Resort was dissolved as a village; it was restructured as a hamlet under the jurisdiction of the Reservation of White Bear Band on that date. The hamlet is located about 14 km north of the town of Carlyle on highway 9.

Carlyle Lake Resort is also home to the 18-hole White Bear Golf Course. Bear Claw Casino & Hotel is a short distance north on Highway 9.

See also
List of communities in Saskatchewan
Hamlets of Saskatchewan
List of golf courses in Saskatchewan

References

Former villages in Saskatchewan
Unincorporated communities in Saskatchewan
Populated places disestablished in 1972